Kukuruku may refer to: 
Kukuruku Hills, Nigeria
Kukuruku Division a former division in a province of Nigeria
Kukuruku people, a former British name of Afemai people, Nigeria
Kukuruku language, a former British name of the language of Afemai people, Nigeria